Fathimath Nahula (born 22 June 1973) is a Maldivian film director, film producer and screenwriter.

Early life
In 1991, Nahula joined Jamaluddin school and worked as a teacher for four years. During the time, she spends most of her time in writing and developing stories. She then penned dialogues and stories for several films and television dramas produced by Television Maldives while publishing handful of them on different platforms including newspapers and magazines. Aiming to deliver the real emotions she write on the paper, Nahula decided to pursue a career in film direction.

Career

1998–2009: Early releases and Yoosuf
She entered the film industry as an assistant director on Abdulla Sujau's Laila (1997), which was based on a story she had earlier written though the screenplay was developed with the help of director, Abdulla Sujau. During the year, she was received the National Award of Recognition in the area of screenwriting. She then made her own directorial debut with the family drama Fahuneyvaa (1998) which portrays the love-conflict of a man choosing between a prominent stage performer and a deaf-mute poor girl. Featuring Hussain Sobah, Mariyam Nisha and Jamsheedha Ahmed in pivotal roles, the film received critical acclaim and was a declared a commercial "hit" by screening twenty six houseful shows at the cinema. Though her first two films were produced by different studios; Corona Arts and Dash Studio respectively, post Fahuneyvaa her next few releases were solely produced by Mapa. Her second directorial venture was Naaummeedhu (2000) which depicts the story of a happily married couple (Reeko Moosa Manik and Mariyam Nisha) whose life is shattered into pieces when they unintentionally invite a seductive woman (Jamsheedha Ahmed) into their life. The film receiving favorable reviews from critics was able to screen twenty eight houseful shows at Olympus Cinema, making it the highest grossing Maldivian film of the year.

In 2002, Nahula worked as the assistant director in Ahmed Shimau family drama film Loabi Nuvevununama (2002) which stars Yoosuf Shafeeu, Mariyam Nazima, Moosa Zakariyya and Ahmed Shimau. Written by Fathimath Nahula, the story narrates the journey of a handicapped man who has been betrayed in love and unknowingly marries his brother's love interest. The film was a critical and commercial success. The following year, she released her third directorial venture; a romantic film Kalaayaanulaa (2003) which follows a happily married couple (Yoosuf Shafeeu and Aishath Shiranee) where the husband decided to marry his childhood best friend (Niuma Mohamed) when his wife fails to sexually please him. The film received widespread critical acclaim for its performances and was declared to be year's highest grossing Maldivian film release. Winning four Gaumee Film Awards and three Miadhu Crystal Awards, Nahula received a Gaumee Film Award nomination as the Best Director.

The series of success were continued with her next release; a critically appreciated and commercially prosperous project, a romantic drama film Zuleykha (2005) which narrates the journey of a nine years old girl seeking the lost love of her mother. Featuring an ensemble cast including Yoosuf Shafeeu, Sheela Najeeb, Mariyam Nisha, Ali Seezan, Mohamed Manik and Mariyam Enash Sinan, the film won five Gaumee Film Awards including the Best Story Award while she received another Gaumee Film Award nomination as the Best Director. Meanwhile, at Miadhu Crystal Awards ceremony, Zuleykha received eight awards including Best Director and Best Story. Thirty three houseful shows of the film were screened at the cinema making it the highest grossing Maldivian release of the year.

In 2008, Nahula released her most successful film; the romantic drama Yoosuf which depicts the story of a deaf and mute man who has been mistreated by a wealthy family, mocking his disability. Featuring an ensemble cast including Yoosuf Shafeeu, Niuma Mohamed, Sheela Najeeb, Mohamed Manik, Ahmed Nimal, Fauziyya Hassan, Ravee Farooq, Zeenath Abbas and Ahmed Lais Asim, the film is considered to include most prominent faces in a Maldivian film. The film received widespread critical acclaim and was attained a blockbuster status at box office. A total of forty five houseful shows were screened at Olympus Cinema before the film was leaked online, however the producers were able to screen five more shows at the cinema making it one of the Maldivian all-time highest grossing movies. The film was Maldivian official entry at 2009 SAARC Film Festivals and holds the privilege of being the opening movie of the festival. At 6th Gaumee Film Awards, Nahula was bestowed with Best Art Direction and Best Choreography award, while being nominated as the Best Director and Editor. The film, winning seven awards at 1st Maldives Film Awards, including Film of the Year (Viewer's Choice), Nahula was credited with a nomination as the Best Director. Her next directorial venture was the romantic drama film Soora (2008), directed along with Yoosuf Shafeeu. The film was originally released as a television series to positive response.

2010–present: Expansion into film production
Later in 2010, Nahula wrote and co-produced Yoosuf Shafeeu's Veeraana, a drama film that deals with child sexual abuse. Starring Shafeeu, Niuma Mohamed and Amira Ismail the film received mixed to positive reviews from critics, praising the writer and director for touching a condemnatory topic though criticing its "over-the-top melodrama". Having a strong buzz prior its release, the film was proved to be a commercial success. Her next production was Ravee Farooq-directed romantic drama film Mihashin Furaana Dhandhen (2012), starring Niuma Mohamed, Mohamed Manik and Ali Seezan. Upon release, the film received mixed response from critics while Ahmed Nadheem of Haveeru noted the film as "the best Maldivian melodramatic film" he had seen in the past two years, though displeased with its similarities between two Bollywood films. At 3rd Maldives Film Awards, Nahula received a nomination for Best Screenplay and Best Costume Design.

In 2016, Nahula yet again occupied the director's seat alongside Ahmed Sinan for the horror film 4426; a genre she has not explored before. Upon release, the film received mostly positive reviews from critics. Ahmed Nadheem of Avas labelled the film as a "masterpiece" and wrote: "Nahula has arranged the sequences of the scenes a tidy note giving the viewers no space for complains in the plot. The only are she lacks the expertise; technical department is a revelation in this film compared to her previous works". However, it was also considered to be her "best performance" so far. Ahmed Adhushan reviewing for Mihaaru credited the screenplay of the film as its "hero". "Nahula has proved the industry that she is capable to write stories beyond romance". With twenty five houseful shows being screened, 4426 was declared as the highest-grossing Maldivian film of the year.

2018 was a dull year for Maldivian film-industry with regards to 2018 Maldivian presidential election. Her only release of the year was the first Maldivian web-series, a romantic drama, Huvaa. The series consisting of sixty episodes and streamed through the digital platform Baiskoafu, centers around a happy and radiant family which breaks into despairing pieces after a tragic incident that led to an unaccountable loss. The pilot episode was viewed by more than 16,000 users at the time of release and was declared to be a success.

Filmography

Feature film

Short film

Television

Accolades

References

External links

Living people
People from Malé
1973 births
Maldivian women film directors
Maldivian film directors